Olof Salmén (1927–28 May 2011) was a politician in Åland, an autonomous and Swedish-speaking territory of Finland.

Member of the Lagting (Åland parliament) 2001-2003
Vice Lantråd (deputy premier) and Minister for finance 1999-2001
Member of the Lagting (Åland parliament)1988-1999
President of the Nordic Council 1996-1997
Member of government 1980-1987
Member of the Lagting (Åland parliament) 1979, 1971–1975

Salmén was president of the Nordic Council 1996–1997.

See also
 Government of Åland

References

1927 births
2011 deaths
Politicians from Åland
Recipients of the Order of the Cross of Terra Mariana, 4th Class